The 1965–66 Taça de Portugal was the 26th edition of the Portuguese football knockout tournament, organized by the Portuguese Football Federation (FPF). The 1965–66 Taça de Portugal began on 6 November 1965. The final was played on 22 May 1966 at the Estádio Nacional.

Vitória de Setúbal were the previous holders, having defeated Benfica 3–1 in the previous season's final. Defending champions Vitória de Setúbal reached the final but were unable to regain the Taça de Portugal as Braga defeated the Sadinos 1–0 to claim their first Taça de Portugal.

First round
Ties were played between the 6–21 November, whilst replays were played at a later date. Unlike previous editions, two legged first round cup ties were abolished which meant that each cup tie would be contested over one leg. In case a match was tied, the tie would be replayed at a later date. Teams from the Primeira Liga (I) and the Portuguese Second Division (II) entered at this stage.

|}

Second round
Ties were played between the 1–10 December and the 22 February, whilst replays were played at a later date. Due to the odd number of teams involved at this stage of the competition, Cova da Piedade qualified for the next round due to having no opponent to face at this stage of the competition.

|}

Third round
Ties were played between the 9–20 March. Third round ties were contested over two legs. Due to the odd number of teams involved at this stage of the competition, Beira-Mar and Vitória de Setúbal qualified for the next round due to having no opponent to face at this stage of the competition. Lusitânia, Marítimo,  and Mindelense were invited to participate in the competition.

|}

Quarter-finals
Ties were played on the 10–19 April.

|}

Semi-finals
Ties were played on the 8–17 May.

|}

Final

References

Taça de Portugal seasons
1965–66 domestic association football cups
1965–66 in Portuguese football